Raymond LeRoy Haight (July 18, 1897 – September 2, 1947) was an American lawyer and politician from California. Involved in the Republican and Commonwealth-Progressive parties, Haight ran as a third party candidate during the 1934 California gubernatorial election.

Biography
Haight was born in San Jose, California to George Haight and Isabella Hawkins. Haight's grandfather's first cousin was Henry Huntly Haight, the Governor of California from 1867 to 1871. Haight was also related to Henry Haight, a prominent pioneer and San Francisco banker during the California Gold Rush. Haight was educated in law at the University of Southern California, editing the Daily Trojan for a year between 1918 and 1919. Following graduation, Haight entered a Los Angeles-based law practice (Haight & Mathes, which would eventually become Sheppard, Mullin, Richter & Hampton), and quickly gained a reputation with corporate investigations.

In the 1934 California gubernatorial election, Haight initially campaigned for the Republican nomination, gaining 85,000 votes. Haight ultimately lost to Frank Merriam, who had recently been installed as governor following the death of James Rolph. Haight continued to pursue the governorship, gaining the crossed Commonwealth-Progressive Party's nomination, running against the right-wing leaning Merriam, and against former Socialist Party of America member and still self-avowed socialist, author Upton Sinclair, the Democratic Party candidate. During the campaign, there was discussion amongst Democratic supporters, including A. P. Giannini, of asking Sinclair to leave the race in favor of Haight, due to belief that Haight's moderate politics and unassociation with socialism would stand better against Merriam's conservatism. Sinclair, however, remained unyielding.

Haight campaigned as a centrist between the right Merriam and the left Sinclair, seeking support from voters dissatisfied with both candidates. Haight garnered 302,519 votes, 13% of the vote. Much of Haight's voting strength came from the San Joaquin Valley, where farmers were suspicious to Sinclair's End Poverty in California scheme to take over so-called 'idle farms'. With 13% of the vote, Haight arguably spoiled Sinclair's chances for the governorship.

Haight would unsuccessfully run again as a Progressive in the 1938 election, though he would never garner the same support as he did in 1934. Haight returned to law, and rejoined Republican ranks. He served as a delegate to the 1944 Republican National Convention in Chicago.

Haight died in San Diego on September 2, 1947.

References

1897 births
1947 deaths
California Republicans
California Progressives (1924)
Politicians from San Jose, California
California lawyers
University of Southern California alumni
20th-century American lawyers